Mayobanex de Óleo (born 26 May 1993) is a Dominican sprinter. He competed in the men's 4 × 100 metres relay at the 2016 Summer Olympics.

References

1993 births
Living people
Dominican Republic male sprinters
Olympic athletes of the Dominican Republic
Athletes (track and field) at the 2016 Summer Olympics
Place of birth missing (living people)
Athletes (track and field) at the 2019 Pan American Games
Pan American Games competitors for the Dominican Republic